The Battle of Snuol, fought over the border inside Snuol a Cambodian district, was a major battle of the Vietnam War, conducted by the Army of the Republic of Vietnam (ARVN) as part of Operation Toàn Thắng TT02. The battle lasted from 5 January to 30 May 1971.

Background
In 1970 the joint South Vietnamese and U.S Cambodian Incursion was  viewed as an overall success after Allied troops successfully captured a huge enemy cache consisting of food and weapon supplies. Although relatively little contact was made during the operation, the Viet Cong (VC) and People's Army of Vietnam (PAVN) troops were forced to move deeper into Cambodian territory.

One year following the incursion, General Nguyễn Văn Hiếu and General Đỗ Cao Trí made a plan to go back into Cambodia to find and destroy the PAVN/VC. According to General Hieu's plan, instead of searching for the enemy, the ARVN would use one regiment to try to lure the PAVN/VC out and then trap them once they come out to attack. ARVN commanders called this the "luring the tiger down the mountain tactic".

In order to carry out their mission, the ARVN was ready to commit the 5th, 18th and 25th Divisions just in case the PAVN/VC came out in force.

Battle
Prior to the luring operation, 11 sensors were planted along Route 13 north and south of Snuol during two separate operations. The monitoring equipment was operated by the ARVN 5th Division located in Lộc Ninh.

On 4 January 1971, the ARVN Task Force 9 was formed with the mission of luring out the PAVN/VC. Task Force 9 consisted of the 9th Regiment, 74th Ranger Battalion, 11th Armored Cavalry Regiment and the 5th Engineer Company. They were supported by the U.S. 3rd Squadron, 17th Air Cavalry.

On 26 February General Nguyễn Văn Minh took over command of the operation after General Đỗ Cao Trí died in a helicopter crash. Instead of continuing on with the original plan, General Minh choose to apply withdrawal tactics without air-support, if successful the PAVN/VC would be annihilated by several ARVN divisions during the final phase. But if not, the task force would be destroyed.

During the months of January and February the ARVN made little contact with the enemy because the PAVN/VC often avoided heavy engagements. However, by May things were about to change after Task Force 9 was replaced by Task Force 8 (8th Regiment). Throughout April Task Force 8 conducted raid and sweeping operations near PAVN/VC bases, but the ARVN were disappointed again as the PAVN/VC melted away without putting up significant resistance.

On 25 May the PAVN 5th and 7th Divisions began encircling Task Force 8 positions. For the next five days the PAVN assaulted the besieged Task Force 8, but they could not destroy the main formation because of diversionary attacks conducted by the ARVN on the night of 29 May, which led PAVN commanders to believe that Task Force 8 would attack them from the north. The PAVN subsequently deployed their anti-aircraft units to the north, and left their units in the south of Snuol exposed to the firepower of the U.S 17th Air Cavalry.

Massed formations from the regular PAVN divisions placed immense pressure on the ARVN's movements, and without any air support or rescue, Task Force 8 was on the brink of collapse. At that point, General Nguyễn Văn Hiếu decided to execute his withdrawal plan which occurred over three stages. Despite the encirclement, the ARVN were able to fight their way out under extreme duress and made it home.

Aftermath
When the battle had ended ARVN casualties included 37 killed, 167 wounded and 74 missing, 1,043 PAVN/VC were claimed to have been killed throughout the battle.

The PAVN claim to have eliminated 14,000 ARVN and 6,000 Khmer National Army troops, destroyed over 1,500 vehicles (including 369 tanks and armored vehicles) and 169 artillery pieces and shot down 200 aircraft and captured 700 prisoners, 1,800 weapons, 34 vehicles and other ammunition and supplies during the operation.

On 2 June 1971, North Vietnamese propaganda claimed that "over three hours' fierce engagement with Saigon troops on May 30, wiped out the 8th Infantry Multi-Battalion Unit, the 1st Armoured Regiment, and a mixed artillery battalion, killing or wounding 1,500 troops and capturing 300 others, and inflicting other losses on the enemy".

The battle rendered the ARVN 5th Division combat ineffective in the estimation of its American advisers. According to II Field Force, Vietnam commander Michael S. Davison, the 5th Division troops were close to mutiny. When Toan Thang 01/71 ended early in June, Maj. Gen. Jack J. Wagstaff, Davison’s replacement as senior US adviser to III Corps, declared that it had failed to attain two of its objectives, stopping enemy supply movement across Highway 7 and cleaning out the caches around the Chup Plantation, but had accomplished the third, keeping three PAVN divisions out of III Corps during the dry season and inflicting significant casualties upon them.

References

External links
Operation Snoul
The Retreat of Snoul.

Conflicts in 1971
1971 in Cambodia
Battles and operations of the Vietnam War in 1971
Battles involving the United States
Battles involving Vietnam
Snuol